The 1966 Los Angeles Rams season was the team's 29th year with the National Football League and the 21st season in Los Angeles.

The Rams had an 8–6 record, their first winning season since 1958, and only their second since 1955, when the Rams went all the way to the NFL Championship Game. Los Angeles finished in third place in the Western Conference, four games behind the Green Bay Packers. The Rams were led by first-year head coach George Allen, who was inducted in the Pro Football Hall of Fame in 2002.

Roster

Schedule

Game summaries

Week 1

Standings

References

Los Angeles Rams
Los Angeles Rams seasons
Los Angeles Rams